Eulimastoma canaliculatum is a species of sea snail, a marine gastropod mollusk in the family Pyramidellidae, the pyrams and their allies.

Distribution
This species occurs in the following locations:
 Aruba
 Bonaire
 Caribbean Sea
 Colombia
 Curaçao
 Gulf of Mexico
 Jamaica
 Mexico
 Puerto Rico

References

External links
 To Encyclopedia of Life
 To World Register of Marine Species

Pyramidellidae
Gastropods described in 1850